Nuoramoisjärvi is a medium-sized lake in the Kymijoki main catchment area. It is located in Sysmä, Päijänne Tavastia region.

See also
List of lakes in Finland

References
  (The English version was not available as of 13 July 2014.)

Lakes of Sysmä